Eremophila santalina is a flowering plant in the figwort family, Scrophulariaceae and is endemic to South Australia. It is an erect, glabrous shrub with thin branches, flexible leaves and white or cream-coloured flowers which sometimes have a slight pinkish-purple tinge.

Description
The branches and leaves are sticky when young, due to the presence of resin.

The petal tube is white to cream-coloured often with a pinkish-purple tinge and lacks spots. The petal tube and lobes are glabrous apart from the inside of the middle part of the lower lobe which has long soft hairs. The lower lobe is also raised so that it closes the petal tube. The 4 stamens are enclosed in the petal tube.

Taxonomy
The species was first formally described in 1853 by Ferdinand von Mueller who gave it the name Pholidiopsis santalina and published the description in Linnaea. In 1860, Mueller changed the name to Eremophila santalina and published the change in Papers and Proceedings of the Royal Society of Van Diemen's Land. The specific epithet (santalina) refers to the similarity of the habit of this species to that of plants in the Santalaceae genus Santalum.

Distribution and habitat
Eremophila santalina grows on rocky hillsides and along stream beds between Hawker and Mambray Creek in the Mount Remarkable National Park in the Flinders Ranges and Eyre Peninsula botanical regions of South Australia.

Use in horticulture
The pendulous branches and dark green leaves as well as the hanging flowers are attractive features of this large shrub. It can be propagated from cuttings, although roots are often slow to develop. It will grow in a range of soils, including clay but faster in lighter soils in full sun. It is very drought tolerant and relatively frost hardy. Unusually, it will tolerate high humidity and is grown successfully in areas like Sydney and coastal areas of Victoria.

References

santalina
Eudicots of Western Australia
Plants described in 1859
Taxa named by Ferdinand von Mueller